Wombleton is a village and civil parish in the Ryedale district of North Yorkshire, England.

The village has one public house, the Plough Inn, which was renovated in 2012.  It has retained its original character, serves food and holds village community events.  The pub is situated on the eastern side of the village on the junction with Main Street and Page Lane.  Further along Page Lane there is a playing field with a cricket ground, a tennis court and a children's playground.

Wombleton also formed a football team for the start of the 2013–14 season and are currently in the Beckett League Division 1, after becoming the first team to win the 2nd division and 1st division in two consecutive seasons. They joined the York League Division Three in summer 2018.

The village no longer has a chapel, but the Wombleton Parish Hall on Page Lane acts as the focal point for occasional religious services. It also holds regular village and community events.

Approximately  to the south of the village on the road to Harome, is the turning for an old RAF airfield RAF Wombleton.  It is now a private airfield and the location of a popular caravan campsite.  Also at the turning on the Harome road is a Second World War Royal Canadian Air Force (RCAF) memorial.

History 
Wombleton is mentioned in the Domesday Book in 1086, and was then held by the Archbishop of York.  As late as 1831 Wombleton was still in the liberty of St Peter's, York.

Wombleton was a township in the ancient parish of Kirkdale.  It became a separate civil parish in 1866.

References

External links

Villages in North Yorkshire
Civil parishes in North Yorkshire